This is a list of movies filmed in Prague, Czech Republic.

References

Films shot in the Czech Republic
Prague
Prague-related lists
Prague
Prague